Green Island is an island off the northwest coast of Kennedy Town, Hong Kong Island, separated by the Sulphur Channel. A smaller island nearby to the east, uninhabited, is called Little Green Island. Administratively, the two islands are part of Central and Western District.

Buildings 
Green Island is largely uninhabited and at the east coast is Green Island Reception Centre and Green Island Police Station. On the top of the hill is an office of the Marine Department and a lighthouse southwest guides the ships in Sulphur Channel.

Lighthouse compound 

The buildings of the Green Island Lighthouse Compound were declared as monuments, In 2008. The historic buildings include the two lighthouses built in 1875 and 1905 and the European quarters of the lighthouse compound. These three buildings are individually Grade II historic buildings.

There are two cross-shaped openings on its wall for ventilation and lighting. The openings resemble gun-posts like those found in medieval European castles. These are of the same construction as those found on the Cape Collinson Lighthouse at Siu Sai Wan, Hong Kong Island. It was later disused in 1905 because the building was too small to carry the lens from the Cape D'Aguilar Lighthouse.

Construction began on a second lighthouse in 1904, completed in 1905, which was originally intended to house the Cape D’Aguilar light. A concrete spiral staircase with rails gives access to the lantern room. An upper floor was added to the keeper's house in 1923 and the lighthouse was automated in the 1970s. The two lighthouses, along with Cape D'Aguilar Lighthouse, Waglan Island Lighthouse and Tang Lung Chau Lighthouse (Kap Sing Lighthouse) are the only prewar lighthouses remaining.

Living quarters and house
The keeper's house has a flat roof and is designed in an 'L' shape. The house has arched windows and hanging eaves.

The quarters was converted to the Police Recreation Centre for an unknown time. It is currently leased to the Wu Oi Christian Centre as a youth drug treatment rehabilitation centre.

Green Island Reception Centre
The Green Island Reception Centre was historically used as a temporary reception centre for Vietnamese refugees. As of 1997, it was used to accommodate Vietnamese illegal immigrants (VIIs) temporarily for quarantine purposes. The Centre was then managed by the CSD.

Flora and fauna 

The island is densely covered with woodland and tall scrub. A total of 150 plant species and a large variety of butterfly species has been found. One ant species not previously found elsewhere in Hong Kong was recorded on Green Island. The locally rare reef egret and white-bellied sea eagle have been seen on the island.

Air traffic 
Green Island is an important reporting point for location aviation in Hong Kong for entry to Victoria Harbour by air. All local traffic flying into or out of the harbour must report overhead Green Island. As the harbour is quite narrow and aviation traffic can be heavy at times due to the large number of helicopters and light aircraft, Green Island can also act as a holding point before permission to enter is granted by air traffic control.

Weather station

Shelved reclamation plan 
This included a coastal highway from Kennedy Town to Aberdeen (then called Route 7) and a fourth cross-harbour tunnel to a proposed container port at North Lantau. This proposal was shelved due to strong opposition from environmental concern groups.

See also 

 List of lighthouses in Hong Kong
 Waglan Lighthouse
 Cape D'Aguilar Lighthouse
 Tang Lung Chau Lighthouse

References

External links 

 Biodiversity of the island (WWF HK)
 "Review of Egretries in Hong Kong", in Hong Kong Biodiversity, Issue No. 14 March 2007, pp. 1-6.
 Aerial image from Google Map
 
 

Victoria Harbour
Central and Western District, Hong Kong
Populated places in Hong Kong
Islands of Hong Kong